Charles L. Lootens (May 14, 1900 – May 10, 1994) was an American sound engineer. He was nominated for four Academy Awards in the category Best Sound Recording.

Selected filmography
 Army Girl (1938)
 Man of Conquest (1939)
 Behind the News (1940)
 The Devil Pays Off (1941)

References

External links

1900 births
1994 deaths
American audio engineers
20th-century American engineers
Academy Award for Technical Achievement winners